Charles Barclay (2 October 1837 – 2 January 1910) was an English cricketer. He played two first-class matches for Cambridge University Cricket Club between 1859 and 1860. He was educated at Harrow School for whom he played cricket.

See also
 List of Cambridge University Cricket Club players

References

External links
 

1837 births
1910 deaths
English cricketers
Cambridge University cricketers
Cricketers from Greater London
People educated at Harrow School